Chongqing–Wanzhou intercity railway is a high speed railway between urban Chongqing and its satellite district of Wanzhou. It is also known at the Yu-Wan Railway, which are abbreviations for Chongqing and Wanzhou. Construction started in December 2012, according to the summarizing and commending meeting of the phase II of "100-day Battle" in Chongqing Liangjiang New Area. It was completed on 29 November 2016 and takes passengers from Chongqing North Railway Station to Wanzhou North railway station in one hour. This railway forms a smaller section of two larger railway projects, the Chongqing–Xi'an high-speed railway and the Zhengzhou–Wanzhou high-speed railway, extending north and northeast from Wanzhou respectively. It was opened on 28 November 2016.

Route Description
The -long Chongqing–Wanzhou railway is designed to run at a speed of  connecting Chongqing North Railway, Fusheng, Changshou, Changshou Lake, Dianjiang County, Liangping and Wanzhou, according to the approval from The Ministry of Railways of PRC. 

 It has been built as a double tracked electrified high speed railway.
 It has been built to the heavy rail standard with continuous welded track on ballastless track
 The length of the line supported on bridges or viaducts is 39.67% of the total railway length.
 The length of the line through tunnels is 31.77% of total railway length.
 The length of the line built at grade, on ground level is 29.66%

Operations
The train can take passengers from Wanzhou North or Dianjiang County to urban Chongqing in 90 or 30 minutes respectively. High speed services extend to Chengdu with a travel time of 3 and a half hours.

Future

A second route between Chongqing and Wanzhou, the Chongqing–Wanzhou high-speed railway, on a faster  alignment, is expected to open in 2025.

References

High-speed railway lines in China
Railway lines opened in 2016